Bagna may refer to:
Bagna, Pomeranian Voivodeship (north Poland)
Bagna, Silesian Voivodeship (south Poland)
Bagna, West Pomeranian Voivodeship (north-west Poland)